The Juno Awards of 1972, representing Canadian music industry achievements of the previous year, were awarded on 28 February 1972 in Toronto at a ceremony at the Inn on the Park hotel's Centennial Ballroom.

Interest in these music awards was gaining rapidly as approximately 1000 attended the ceremonies, compared to 250 in 1970. George Wilson of CFRB radio was again the master of ceremonies for the awards.

Roughly 3000 subscribers of RPM Magazine completed a survey which determined the winners of this year's awards. Most awards are determined by the poll, except for the songwriting category which was chosen by RPM editor Walt Grealis.

Winners

Best Female Vocalist
Winner: Anne Murray

Outstanding Performance - Female
Winner: Ginette Reno

Best Male Vocalist
Winner: Gordon Lightfoot

Outstanding Performance - Male
Winner: Joey Gregorash

Best Group
Winner: The Stampeders

Outstanding Performance - Group
Winner: Lighthouse

Best Songwriter
Winner: Rich Dodson

Best Country Female Artist
Winner: Myrna Lorrie

Best Country Male Artist
Winner: Stompin' Tom Connors

Best Country Group or Duo
Winner: The Mercey Brothers

Folk Singer of the Year
Winner: Bruce Cockburn

Broadcaster of the Year
Winner: The CHUM Group

Top Canadian Content Company of the Year
Winner: GRT of Canada

Top Record Company of the Year
Winner: Kinney Music of Canada

Top Promotional Company of the Year
Winner: Kinney Music of Canada

Journalist of the Year
Winner: Ritchie Yorke

Contribution to Canadian music
Winner: George Hamilton IV

Nominated and winning albums

Best Produced MOR Album
Winner: Talk It Over in the Morning by Anne Murray (produced by Brian Ahern)

Nominated and winning releases

Best Produced Single
Winner: "Sweet City Woman" by The Stampeders (produced by Mel Shaw

References

Notes

General

External links
Juno Awards site

1972
1972 music awards
1972 in Canadian music